KHMB (99.5 FM) is a radio station broadcasting an adult contemporary music format. Licensed to Hamburg, Arkansas, United States.  The station is currently owned by R&M Broadcasting.

References

External links

HMB
Hamburg, Arkansas